Monsterland and Monster Island are fictional locations in Toho Studios' Godzilla film franchise, both serving as nature reserves or homes for several giant monsters.

Monsterland
Monsterland was introduced in the 1968 film Destroy All Monsters. The United Nations had decided to gather all the Earth's kaiju (giant monsters) and corral them into a single location, then keep them there. The Ogasawara Islands were chosen for the project and by 1999 ("at the close of the 20th century" according to the subtitles in the original Japanese version but on a newspaper it says 1994), Godzilla, Rodan, Mothra, Anguirus, Gorosaurus, Kumonga, Minilla, Baragon, Manda, and Varan were all residents of Monsterland. Various security devices were installed on the island to make sure the kaiju wouldn't escape. Among the various devices were machines that sprayed different types of mist that Godzilla and Mothra shied away from, as well as a magnetic wall that prevented Rodan from flying away.

All was well until the Kilaaks invaded, taking control of Monsterland and letting loose the monsters upon the world. After the Kilaaks were foiled, the monsters returned to Monsterland and have been living there since.

Monsters on the island

 Anguirus
 Baragon
 Godzilla
 Gorosaurus
 Kumonga
 Manda
 Minilla
 Mothra
 Rodan
 Varan

Monster Island
Monster Island first appeared in 1969's All Monsters Attack, in the dreams of a young boy named Ichiro. He dreamt of befriending Minilla and watching him and Godzilla battle other monsters. In the dream, the kaiju living on Monster Island included Godzilla, Minilla, Gabara, 3 Kamacuras, Kumonga, Ebirah, Anguirus, Gorosaurus, Manda, Giant Condor, Maneater (a plant man that grabs Ichiro in the jungle), and Rodan (mentioned but unseen).

Monster Island is revealed to be an actual island in Godzilla vs. Gigan (1972). Godzilla, Rodan, Mothra, Anguirus, Minilla, Gorosaurus, Kumonga, and Kamacuras (one of them) are seen living there.

Monster Island appeared again in Godzilla vs. Megalon (1973), one of many locations suffering the effects of nuclear testing. This is seen to disturb Godzilla, Rodan, and Anguirus. As they try to escape the explosions, Anguirus falls into a crevasse in the ground. Rodan's fate was never revealed, though it can be assumed he flew away safely.

Godzilla was summoned from Monster Island in a few of the episodes of the television series Zone Fighter to assist the giant superhero, specifically the first episode that Godzilla appeared in. These Zone Fighter episodes are considered by Toho to be canon.

It is commonly speculated to be Sollgel Island from Son of Godzilla due to its South Pacific location and the timing of introduction and presence of Godzilla, Minilla, Kamacuras and Kumonga, all kajiu who had been previously seen on the island whereas most other kajiu had not had set locations of origin. Also, "Monster Island" is an alternate name given to the island as stated in the Japanese version of the film by one of the characters as well as its Japanese title.

Monsters on the island

 Anguirus
 Ebirah
 Gabara
 Giant Condor
 Godzilla
 Gorosaurus
 Kamacuras
 Kumonga
 Manda
 Maneater
 Minilla
 Rodan

Godzilla: The Series
Another version of Monster Island existed in Godzilla: The Series, the continuation of the 1998 film Godzilla. It is originally called Isla del Diablo (not to be confused with the real-life Devil's Island) and is given the codename: SITE OMEGA. This island was originally the base of operations for the Tachyon aliens as proposed by Major Hicks. The island eventually became home to Crustaceous Rex, King Cobra, the Giant Bat, Skeetera, the Giant Mutant Hummingbirds, and possibly the Shrewster as well as the combined monster population of the Mutant Colosseum and the Mutant Mania Circus. Godzilla also visited the island occasionally. Because he traveled with H.E.A.T., he never became a permanent resident. Large, cage-like apparatuses were installed on the island to keep the creatures isolated from each other and they remain on Monster Island to this day. At one point, the base was infiltrated by an organization of eco-terrorists called S.C.A.L.E. who tried to free the monsters, which only resulted in a large scale battle between the beasts before they were imprisoned in their respectful areas once again.

In an alternate timeline shown in the episode "Future Shock", the monsters on Monster Island were unleashed by the United States military to help fight the invincible Dragma creatures. However, every monster (including Godzilla) that fought to protect a large number of humans was slaughtered by their might. They were given a hero's commemoration via a statue of Godzilla by the survivors.

Other Appearances
In Scott Ciencin's Godzilla junior novels, Monster Island first existed as a government research facility created to study Anguirus and Rodan. Eventually, with the help of a pair of psychic children, Godzilla led a troop of other monsters (including Varan, Kamacuras, Kumonga, and several oversized animals) to the island and make it their new home. The monsters were quickly disappointed, however,  by humans such as scientists and military men constantly pestering them. Overeager tourists also regularly came to take their pictures. This changed after Godzilla rallied his fellow kaiju against King Ghidorah and saved the world. In gratitude, the humans abandoned Monster Island and gave it over to the monsters. Ciencin's last novel closed with Godzilla thinking that he had finally come home.

Monster Island is a playable arena in the video games Godzilla: Destroy All Monsters Melee, Godzilla: Save the Earth, and Godzilla: Unleashed. In the latter, it has, like the game's other arenas, been affected by the spread of alien crystals. Early speculation was that the island would be partially flooded, but the arena is the same as that in the first two games other than the presence of the crystals. Producer Shelby Wills explained that the island is the "starting point" for the playable faction, Earth Defenders, in the game and so it does not show the same signs of apocalyptic damage as the game's other environments.

Monster Island has also returned in IDW Publishing's Godzilla comics, particularly the Godzilla: Gangsters and Goliaths miniseries.

Other Islands
Other islands have appeared in Godzilla films as homes to the various monsters. They include Iwato island in Godzilla Raids Again where he fought Anguirus; Letchi Island - a home to Ebirah, the sea monster who Godzilla fought, in Ebirah, Horror of the Deep; and Sollgell Island where Godzilla adopted his son Minilla—and fought various monsters—in Son of Godzilla. In the second series of films he adopts his son on Adonoa Island (Godzilla vs. Mechagodzilla II) and raises him on Birth Island (Godzilla vs. SpaceGodzilla).

Mothra is shown to live on Infant Island, sometimes with human worshipers, sometimes without. Toho's King Kong lives on his own island(s) - Farou and Mondo.

A real "monster"
On September 27, 2005, the first filmed evidence of a live "Architeuthis" (Giant squid) in the wild was shot off near Ogasawara Islands, the islands which were used in much of the Godzilla mythos as being "Monster Island".

In popular culture

Several references to "Monster Island" are likely based on this element from the Godzilla series.

 In The Simpsons episode "Lisa on Ice", Lisa imagines being sentenced to "a lifetime of horror on Monster Island" for failing Physical Education. The judge reassures her that the term "Monster Island" is just a name, but Lisa discovers that the island is in fact the home of several kaiju. Fleeing from the giant creatures (which are Mothra, Rodan and Gamera), Lisa asks one of her fellow inmates why the judge said it was "just a name". He replies that the judge meant Monster Island is in fact a peninsula.
 The Monsta Island Czars are a hip-hop group from New York City, most of whose individual names are parodies of kaiju names.
 In Warren Ellis' s Planetary series, there is Island Zero, home to many kaiju, including what is apparently King Ghidorah, Godzilla and Mothra, all dead. A green, flying kaiju similar to Rodan has, however, survived.
 In DC Comics, Dinosaur Island was often called Mystery Island or Monster Island during its initial appearances in the pages of Star Spangled War Stories.
 In the first issue of Marvel Comics' Fantastic Four series (1961), Monster Isle was the name of an island ruled by the villainous Mole Man and populated by various giant creatures which predates Toho's version. The island has been described both as located near Japan as well as in the Bermuda Triangle and has occasionally appeared in other Marvel comic books—although, surprisingly, never in Marvel's Godzilla series. Most of the known Marvel Comics monsters reside on Monster Isle.
 On Buffy the Vampire Slayer, Xander Harris likes living near the Hellmouth rather than living on Monster Island.
 In The Grim Adventures of Billy & Mandy TV movie Billy and Mandy's Big Boogey Adventure, the race that Team Grim and Team Boogey had to go through to win the privilege to fight Horror included getting past Monster Island, and encountered the Toho monsters Godzilla, Anguirus, Rodan, King Ghidorah and Gigan and the Daiei monster Gamera. Godzilla has his roar from the Heisei series.
 In The Powerpuff Girls episode "Super Zeroes", a giant slimy teal blob-like monster named Steven (voiced by Dee Bradley Baker) explains to the girls that going to Townsville to encounter the Powerpuff Girls and return (alive) from fighting them is a symbol of honor on Monster Isle, where most of the show's city-destroying monsters reside. In "Monstra-City", the deed to Monster Isle being claimed by the Mayor of Townsville causes all of its monsters to move to Townsville as the Powerpuff Girls work to keep the peace. The peace between the Townsville citizens and Monster Isle's monsters was brief until a one-eyed monster was poked in the eye by someone who claimed he kept looking at him. When the problem between the Townsville citizens and Monster Isle's monsters escalates, the Powerpuff Girls break up the fight as the only thing both groups have in common is that they hate each other. With help from a giant monster lawyer (voiced by Kevin Michael Richardson), the Powerpuff Girls were able to get the Mayor of Townsville to give Monster Isle back to the monsters.
 Top Ten includes a character named Gograh (a Godzilla-like monster) who is said to live on 'Monster Atoll' (presumably an island near Neopolis) with other giant monsters.

References

External links
Monster Island at Scary For Kids

Fictional islands
Godzilla (franchise)
Bonin Islands